The Parc Jean-Jacques-Rousseau is a French landscape garden at Ermenonville, in the Département of Oise. It is named for the philosopher Jean-Jacques Rousseau, who stayed there the last six weeks of his life. He died there in 1778 and was buried in an island in the park. The western part, called "le Désert" is managed by the Institut de France, and the northern part by a hotel/restaurant at the Château d'Ermenonville. The other parts are not open to the public, for various reasons.

History
The park at Ermenonville was created by René de Girardin (1735–1808). Girardin was an officer under Stanislas Leszczyński, and fought in the Seven Years' War.  
Girardin acquired a substantial inheritance from his mother René Hatte in 1762, enabling him to create his park and gardens at Ermenonville. Girardin brought in two hundred English workers to create his garden.

It was  inspired by Jean-Jacques Rousseau's philosophy, in his 1761 work, Julie, or the New Heloise, drawing from the works of the English writers Joseph Addison, Alexander Pope and Anthony Ashley-Cooper, 3rd Earl of Shaftesbury, all three of whom had written on English gardens.

Girardin laid out the garden based on ideas expressed in an essay entitled  De la composition des paysages sur le terrain ou des moyens d'embellir la nature près des habitations en y joignant l'agréable à l'utile ("On the creation of landscapes, or means of embellishing nature near inhabited places in merging the agreeable and the useful").

In the 1770s Rousseau and Girardin met up in Paris. In the spring of 1778, his friend Thérèse Levasseur fell into bad health, and her doctor advised her to have a rest in the countryside. The two then tried to find a new place to live.

Girardin, one of Rousseau's many admirers, invited them to stay at a cottage in his garden, and they did from May 1778. There, Rousseau recovered his extraordinary enthusiasm for nature. As he said to his friend Girardin: "For a long time, my heart drew me here, and what my eyes see, make me want to stay here always".

On 4 July 1778, Rousseau was buried at midnight, by torchlight, on a little island in the park which now bears his name.  His remains were ceremonially relocated to the Panthéon national heroes repository in Paris in 1794.

On 26 December 1787, a violent storm devastated parts of the park, which were only partly repaired.

Reception 
The park was considered one of the foremost English-style parks on the Continent, remarkable "for the landscapes it offered to visitors and the reflections it inspired in the course of a ramble".

It was visited in its early years by several prominent people, including 
Emperor Joseph II of Austria in 1777, Queen Marie-Antoinette in spring 1780, King Gustave III of Sweden in 1783 and First Consul Napoléon Bonaparte, several times beginning in 1800.,  Benjamin Franklin and Maximilien de Robespierre.

See also 

 Jardin anglais
 Ermenonville
 Forêt d'Ermenonville
 Abbaye de Chaalis

References

Bibliography 
 
 , p. 59-80.
 
 
 
 
  (link Google Books)

External links 

 Description du parc Jean-Jacques Rousseau avec plan
 Parc Jean-Jacques Rousseau (Google Maps), the indicator points out the Petit Parc, south of the Rue Réné-de-Girardin. There is no geographic label for the château d'Ermenonville on this map.

Gardens in Oise